Shpock is an online marketplace that allows users to list products for local sale. Shpock is developed and operated by the Austrian start-up finderly GmbH and employs 102 people. Finderly GmbH is owned by Russmedia Equity Partners.

History 

Shpock is a portmanteau meaning "Shop in your pocket" and was first available for free download for iOS and Android devices in September 2012. The app was downloaded more than a million times within the first year. Their first financing came from their own funds and grants. Later, they were invested in by business angels.

In 2013, the Norwegian media group Schibsted announced a seven figures investment into finderly GmbH. In September 2015, Schibsted announced to increase its stake from 82% to 91%.

In 2016, the Shpock app was one of the ten most popular apps in Germany in the App Store and in Google Play, and in 2017, the Shpock app was one of the ten most loaded free iPhone apps in Austria. As of October 2018, the app has been downloaded more than 50 million times on iOS and Android devices.

In November 2018, Schibsted announced that it had purchased the remaining 9% of finderly GmbH from its founders, making it the sole owner of the company. A massive staff reduction was announced shortly after a change of management, with the goal of turning the previously loss-making company into a profitable business. In August 2020, Shpock rebranded, which included a redesigned logo.

In June 2021, Russmedia Equity Partners announced the acquisition of Shpock from Adevinta for an undisclosed sum.

Awards 

In 2018, Shpock was a laureate at the award ceremony "Germany's best online portals 2018" in the "Market places private providers" category of the German Institute for Service Quality. Also in 2018, Shpock was awarded "Android Excellence App of 2018 in the Google Play Store, and Apple selected Shpock as a "Best of 2017" app in the category "Sustainability". At the Goldbach Youngstar Awards, Shpock was named "Youngest Brand in the 1st Half of 2018". In 2013, Shpock won the futurezone Award in the category Apps and was awarded the Mingo special prize at the Content Award Vienna. At the “Show your App Awards" in 2014, Shpock received the Silver app.

See also

 eBay
 Alibaba Group

External links 

 Official website

References

2016 establishments in Austria
German companies established in 2016
Retail companies established in 2016
Internet properties established in 2016
Online marketplaces of Germany
Companies based in Vienna